The Predigtstuhl is a  high mountain in the Wilder Kaiser range in the Northern Limestone Alps in Austria, east of Kufstein in the Tyrol.

The mountain is one of the well-known climbing mountains in the Northern Limestone Alps. Among its most famous climbing routes are the Angermann Gully (Angermannrinne) (normal route at UIAA grade III via the Predigtstuhl wind gap), the striking North Rim (Nordkante) and the Botzong Chimney (Botzong-Kamin). The start point for these routes is the  Stripsenjochhaus mountain hut belonging to the Austrian Alpine Club (ÖAV).

Together with the Hinterer Goinger Halt, Karlspitzen, Fleischbank and Christaturm the peak forms the rim of the Steinerne Rinne, a huge couloir and old glacial cirque, that runs southwards up to the crossing of the Ellmauer Tor.

External links 
Climbing the Predigstuhl 

Mountains of the Alps
Mountains of Tyrol (state)
Kaiser Mountains
Two-thousanders of Austria